Persatuan Sepakbola Ponorogo or Persepon  is a semi-professional Indonesian football club based in Ponorogo, East Java. The club plays in the Liga 3. Their homebase is Batoro Katong Stadium.

Current squads

References

External links
 
Football clubs in Indonesia
Football clubs in East Java
Association football clubs established in 1961
1961 establishments in Indonesia
Ponorogo Regency